Waverley Gardens, is a shopping centre with approximately 110 shops, located 25 km south-east of Melbourne, Australia, in the suburb of Mulgrave, Victoria. The Shopping Centre has the Monash Freeway on its north-east border, Police Road on its southern border and Hansworth Street on the western side.

Redevelopment 
In 2004 a 3-stage redevelopment process began. Refurbishments include the construction of two multi-storey car parks and restoration of a third, the relocation of the bus terminal, the extension of the Shopping Centre on the north-east side, and general improvements to the inside appearance of the shopping locations.

In May 2005, the first major stage of development was completed, with the opening of Coles, as well as many other smaller shops in a corridor towards Target. This included the refurbishment of the entrances, and general appearance of the walkways. Part of this development included the opening of two multi-storey car-parks on the south-western side.

In December 2006, a new-look food court was opened.

The second stage of development was officially completed on 8 March 2007, with the opening of Big W. This included a number of smaller shops, and a restored car-park on the north-eastern side.

External links

Shopping centres in Melbourne
Shopping malls established in 2005
Buildings and structures in the City of Monash
2005 establishments in Australia